The Bell  CH-146 Griffon is a multi-role utility helicopter designed by Bell Helicopter Textron as a variant of the Bell 412EP for the Canadian Armed Forces. The CH-146 is used in a wide variety of roles, including aerial firepower, reconnaissance, search and rescue and aero-mobility tasks.

Design and development
The CH-146 is the Canadian military designation for the Bell 412CF, a modified Bell 412, ordered by Canada in 1992. The CH-146 was built at Mirabel, Quebec, at the Bell Canadian plant. It was delivered between 1995 and 1997 in one of two configurations, the Combat Support Squadron (CSS) version for search and rescue missions, and the Utility Tactical Transport Helicopter (UTTH), which carries a crew of three and an eight-man section.

The Griffon can be equipped with various specialized bolt-on mission kits which can enhance the performance of the Griffon, from increasing range to improving protection against enemy fire, etc.

While the CH-146 can be equipped with a total of 13 seats in the cargo area in addition to the two in front for the aircrew, weight restrictions usually result in a normal combat load of eight equipped troops or fewer depending on armament and fuel carried. The aircraft can also be configured for up to six stretchers.

Minor disassembly permits transport of the Griffon by CC-130 Hercules or CC-177 Globemaster III aircraft for long-distance deployment.

Maintenance and upgrades
The CH-146 Griffon is forecast to be retired in 2021. Bell Helicopter Textron Canada Inc. was awarded a C$640 million contract to overhaul and repair the CH-146 fleet until retirement in 2021. The contract includes options to extend the contract up to 2025 if necessary.

In January 2019, Canada announced plans to modernize and extend the life of the existing 85 CH-146 helicopters to 2031. In May 2022, the contract was signed.

Operational history

The Canadian Forces purchased 100 aircraft and received them in 1995–1997.  In 2005, nine CH-146s were sold to the Allied Wings consortium to be used as trainers at 3 Canadian Forces Flying Training School.

Canada
The CH-146 Griffon have been deployed in various operations in Canada since their introduction in 1995. They have been deployed during the Operation Saguenay in 1996 and Operation Assistance in 1997. The CH-146 have also played a major role during the great ice storm of 1998. They were deployed during the 28th G8 summit and 36th G8 summit. They were also deployed to secure the 2010 Winter Olympics during the Operation Podium. In May 2016, four Griffons were deployed as part of Operation LENTUS 16-01, to provide emergency services for victims of the 2016 Fort McMurray wildfire.

Haiti and Balkans
CH-146s have been deployed in Haiti. They were deployed during Operation Standard and Operation Constable between 1996 and 1997.  They were deployed more recently during Operation Halo in 2004 and Operation Hestia in 2010.

Griffons have been deployed in Bosnia and Kosovo during Operation Kinetic between 1999 and 2000 and Operation Paladium between 1998 and 2004.

Afghanistan
In 2007, the Canadian American Strategic Review suggested that the Canadian Forces consider deploying Griffons to Afghanistan, because they were comparable to the UH-1 Hueys deployed by the United States Marine Corps.

On 26 November 2008, the Canadian Forces announced in a statement that eight Griffons would be modified to act as armed escorts for CH-147 Chinook helicopters in Afghanistan.  Equipped with a M134D Minigun, the helicopters were employed in a defensive and support role, including the evacuation of battlefield casualties.  The eight CH-146s arrived at Kandahar International Airport on 20 December 2008.

Suitability for role
The CH-146 was purchased by the CF to replace four existing helicopters, the CH-136 Kiowa in the observation role, the CH-135 Twin Huey in the army tactical role, the CH-118 Iroquois in the base rescue role and the heavy lift CH-147 Chinook. From the time of its purchase defence analysts have been critical of the aircraft pointing to its procurement as politically motivated and that the aircraft cannot adequately fill any of its intended roles. It has been termed "a civilian designed and built aircraft, with only a coat of green paint."

Writing in 2006 defence analyst Sharon Hobson said:

The CH-146 was ruled out for the Afghan mission by General Rick Hillier when he was Chief of Defence Staff in 2008 due to being underpowered. It has also been criticised for being underpowered by Martin Shadwick, a defence analyst and professor at York University. Shadwick stated in July 2009:

At the inquest into the death of Capt Ben Babington-Browne (killed on 6 July 2009 in the crash of aircraft #146434), Lt Cdr William Robley of the UK Defence Helicopter Flying School confirmed that operating the aircraft at that altitude, temperature and weight meant that it was not the correct helicopter for that mission. When asked by the coroner: "Had you been there, would it have been obvious to you of the risks attached to using the Griffon helicopter in these conditions?" Lt Cdr Robley replied: "Yes." When asked: "Would you expect a competent pilot to have understood that this was not the correct helicopter for the mission?", Lt Cdr Robley replied: "It depended on the pilot's training; unless they have been trained, they are on a voyage of discovery."

Retired Lieutenant General Lou Cuppens defended the aircraft's performance:

Defence Minister Peter MacKay also defended the aircraft:

Operators

 Royal Canadian Air Force
Tactical Helicopter role
400 Tactical Helicopter Squadron 
403 Helicopter Operational Training Squadron 
408 Tactical Helicopter Squadron 
427 Special Operations Aviation Squadron 
430 Tactical Helicopter Squadron 
438 Tactical Helicopter Squadron

Search and Rescue role
424 Transport and Rescue Squadron

Combat Support Squadrons
417 Combat Support Squadron 
439 Combat Support Squadron 
444 Combat Support Squadron

Accidents and incidents
On 18 July 2002, #146420 operated by 444 Sqn crashed north of CFB Goose Bay while returning from a search and rescue mission that had been called off. Both pilots were killed on impact and the SAR Technician and Flight Engineer were both seriously injured. The cause of the crash was the loss of the aircraft tail rotor after a tail rotor blade failed from fatigue.
Three other Canadians were hurt. The crash was reportedly an accident due to the pilot's loss of visual reference in recirculating dust and not due to enemy action, but an inquest into the death of Capt Ben Babington-Browne was told that the helicopter was unsuitable for hot and high operations in Afghanistan. In April 2016, it was revealed that a military police investigation of senior air force officers was underway for negligence for not providing adequate training for aircrew in dealing with takeoffs in dusty conditions and also for raising the operational gross weight of the aircraft above that safe for operation.

Specifications (CH-146)

See also

References

External links

 RCAF CH-146 page
 Bell CH-146 Griffon page rotorhead.org
 An Armed CH-146 Griffon for Kandahar? on CASR's site

CH-146
1990s Canadian helicopters
1990s Canadian military utility aircraft
Military helicopters
Single-turbine helicopters
Aircraft first flown in 1992